Patricia Tanchanok Good (born 18 August 1997) is a Thai-British actress and model currently signed as an actor under Channel 3 HD.

Early Life 
Patricia Tanchanok Good was born on August 18, 1997 in Choeng Thale Subdistrict, Thalang District, Phuket Province. She is the eldest daughter of David Good and Piyanuch Good she has a younger brother, Matthew Good (born 2002), born and raised in Phuket. She moved to live in Bangkok following her father who came to work in Bangkok, when she was 8 years old in 2005 after the devastating tsunami on Sunday December 26, 2004.

Career 
Tanchanok started her career in the entertainment industry when her mother's best friend, known as a former famous heroine and Channel 3 drama producer, Janjira Jujaeng, persuaded her to be cast as an actress. Her first job was as a model for various magazines and later appeared in television commercials before acting in a full-fledged television drama when it was selected by Somjing Srisuphap.

Her first drama work is Noom Ban Rai Kub Wan Jai Hi-So in 2012, playing the role of Noi Na. and later became the first full-length heroine by acting alongside Yuke Songpaisan in the drama Kaen Sanaeha in 2013.

References 

1997 births
Living people
Thai television actresses
Thai models
People from Phuket province
People from Bangkok
Actors from Bangkok
Actresses from Bangkok